Marcel Granollers was the defending champion, but lost to Alexandr Dolgopolov in the quarterfinals.

David Ferrer won the title, defeating Dolgopolov in the final, 6–1, 3–6, 6–4.

Former world No. 1 Juan Carlos Ferrero played his last match at the tournament losing to 6th seed Nicolás Almagro in the first round in straight sets.

Seeds

Draw

Finals

Top half

Bottom half

Qualifying

Seeds

Qualifiers

Draw

First qualifier

Second qualifier

Third qualifier

Fourth qualifier

External links
 Main draw
 Qualifying draw

Singles